D'Juan Woods (born June 11, 1984) is a former American football wide receiver. He was signed by the Jacksonville Jaguars as an undrafted free agent in 2007. He played college football at Oklahoma State.

Woods was also a member of the New Orleans Saints. He was a part of the team that won Super Bowl XLIV. He is the younger brother of former NFL wide receiver Rashaun Woods and older brother of former NFL linebacker Donovan Woods.

External links
Jacksonville Jaguars bio
New Orleans Saints bio
Oklahoma State Cowboys bio
Career transactions

1984 births
Living people
Players of American football from Oklahoma
American football wide receivers
Oklahoma State Cowboys football players
Jacksonville Jaguars players
New Orleans Saints players